William Knight (1840 - 21 November 1923) was an English architect based in Nottingham.

Career

He was born in Sneinton, Nottingham, the son of William Knight (1808-1897), timber merchant, and Mary Ann (b. 1817).

He had offices at 28 Derby Road, and in 1882 moved to East Circus Street, Nottingham.

He married Elizabeth Lindsay Symington (1842-1894), 3rd daughter of James Symington, on 3 April 1872  in St Helen's Church, Oxendon, Leicestershire and they had the following children:
William P. Knight (b. 1873)
Harold Knight (1874-1961)
Ethel Lindsay Knight (1875-1941)
Agnes Mary Knight (1877-1950)
Edgar Knight (b. 1881)

He retired to Great Bowden, Leicestershire, where he died on 21 November 1923.

Notable works

References

1840 births
1923 deaths
Architects from Nottingham